Malusan (also Romanized as Malūsān; also known as Malhūsān, Malīsar, and Mīsar) is a village in Tariq ol Eslam Rural District, in the Central District of Nahavand County, Hamadan Province, Iran. At the 2006 census, its population was 602, in 125 families.

References 

Populated places in Nahavand County